Větrná hora is a 1955 Czechoslovak film. The film starred Josef Kemr.

References

External links
 

1955 films
1950s Czech-language films
Czech adventure films
Czechoslovak black-and-white films
Czechoslovak adventure films
1955 adventure films
1950s Czech films
Czech black-and-white films